Matias Nielsen (born 28 July 1999) is a speedway rider from Denmark.

Speedway career 
Nielsen came to prominence in 2019 when he won the silver medal at the Danish Under 21 Individual Speedway Championship. The following season he repeated the success and also won a silver medal at both the 2020 Team Speedway Junior European Championship and the 2020 Team Speedway Junior World Championship.

In 2022, he won his second European Junior Championship silver medal and rode for Ostrów in Poland and Esbjerg in Denmark.

References 

Living people
1999 births
Danish speedway riders